was a Japanese daimyō of the late Edo period, who ruled the Jōzai Domain. Later in life, he was also known by his style, . During the Boshin War of 1868, Hayashi led his domain's forces in support of the armies of the former shōgun, and then the Ōuetsu Reppan Dōmei. Unlike the Tokugawa forces that went on to Ezo, Hayashi surrendered willingly when he received word that the Tokugawa family was to be granted a fief in Shizuoka. During the Meiji period he worked in various occupations (even as a clerk for a business in Hakodate), before working for the government. In the Meiji period, his family was ennobled as part of the kazoku system. For a time he also served at Tōshō-gū in Nikkō. Hayashi lived well into the 20th century, and was famous as "the last daimyō". He died in early 1941, in an apartment run by his daughter Mitsu.

When asked for a jisei on the day he died, he is reported to have said, "I had one in 1868. Not now." (明治元年にやつた。今は無い)

Hayashi appears as a character in Ikenami Shōtarō's novel Bakumatsu Yūgekitai.

References
Yamakawa Kenjirō (1933). Aizu Boshin senshi. Tokyo: Tokyo Daigaku Shuppankai.
Nakamura Akihiko (2000). Dappan daimyo no Boshinsensō: Kazusa Jōzai hanshu Hayashi Tadataka no shōgai. Tokyo: Chūōkōron-shinsha.

|-

People of the Boshin War
1848 births
1941 deaths
Japanese Shintoists
People from Tokyo
Kazoku
Fudai daimyo